Safin De Coque is the Son of the Nigerian Highlife Legend Late Chief Oliver De Coque. He was mentored and blessed by his father to be a great singer.

Safin De Coque was discovered and signed up in a record deal in 2011 by Kaycee Records, a UK-based recording company with a regional office in Nigeria. Unlike his father, his choice of music genre is Hiphop and his hiphop styled Identity (Remix) is his creative adaptation of his father's late 1970s hit track, Funny Funny Identity.

References

External links
 Safin De Coque Official Website
 KayCee Records Corporate Website

Igbo singers
1982 births
Living people
Nigerian hip hop singers
Musicians from Nnewi
21st-century Nigerian singers